Seana McKenna  (born 15 August 1956) is a Canadian actress primarily associated with stage roles at the Stratford Shakespeare Festival.

Background
Seana McKenna was born in Toronto, Ontario, Canada. She is a graduate of the National Theatre School of Canada, where as a student she played Gwendolen in The Importance of Being Earnest and Isabella in Women Beware Women by Thomas Middleton.

Stratford Shakespeare Festival
McKenna has played over 40 stage roles over the course of 23 years at the Stratford Shakespeare Festival, and major ones from very early on, specializing since the 2000s in strong-willed women but also mesmerizing as an actress looking very different from one role to another.
2013 was her 22nd season: She played Queen Elizabeth I in Friedrich Schiller's Mary Stuart directed by Antoni Cimolino and Madame Arcati in Noël Coward's Blithe Spirit directed by Brian Bedford.

Roles in other companies
She has also played leading roles in many other major houses across Canada, including the title role in Antony and Cleopatra by William Shakespeare (Centaur Theatre), Maggie in Cat on a Hot Tin Roof by Tennessee Williams (Grand Theatre, London), The Search for Signs of Intelligent Life in the Universe by Jane Wagner (Belfry Theatre, Neptune Theatre, National Arts Centre, Manitoba Theatre Centre/MTC), Blanche Dubois in A Streetcar Named Desire by Tennessee Williams  (Theatre New Brunswick), Eliza Dollitle in Pygmalion and the title role in Candida by George Bernard Shaw (Shaw Festival), Medea by Euripides and Hedda Gabler by Henrik Ibsen (MTC),  Blanche Dubois again at MTC, Wit by Margaret Edson at the Canadian Stage Company,   Orpheus Descending by Tennessee Williams at the Manitoba Theatre Centre and Royal Alexandra Theatre,  Doubt: A Parable by John Patrick Shanley at the Canadian Stage Company, Phèdre by Jean Racine (American Conservatory Theater), and The Year of Magical Thinking by Joan Didion (Belfry Theatre, Tarragon Theatre, and National Arts Centre).

Films and TV
Mckenna has also acted in a few films and television, including the 1997 film The Hanging Garden, in which she won a Genie Award for Best Supporting Actress, as well at filmed Stratford productions: Twelfth Night (1986, King John (2015), and Hamlet (2016)

Home life
She married director Miles Potter, and they have one son, Callan, born in 1998.

Stratford Shakespeare Festival credits

DVDs, CDs, Audiobooks, Video clips
Twelfth Night (1986) CBC Home Video, Canadian Broadcasting Corporation, based on the 1985 Stratford Shakespeare Festival production.
Good Mother (2002) by Damien Atkins Bell Canada Reading, CBC Audiobook CD, Canadian Broadcasting Corporation.
Medea (2001) by Euripides CBC Audiobook CD, Canadian Broadcasting Corporation, based on the 2001 Stratford Shakespeare Festival production.
Narrator for Away, novel in Audiobook format by Jane Urquhart.
Interview for Theatre Museum Canada by R.H. Thomson https://www.youtube.com/watch?v=2qPUVOzJkrU

References

External links

Actresses from Toronto
Canadian stage actresses
Canadian film actresses
Best Supporting Actress Genie and Canadian Screen Award winners
Living people
Members of the Order of Canada
Dora Mavor Moore Award winners
1956 births
Canadian Shakespearean actresses